The Divide is a 2015 documentary film directed by British filmmaker Katharine Round. It was produced by Katharine Round and Christopher Hird. It is an adaptation of the acclaimed 2009 socio-economic book The Spirit Level by Richard G. Wilkinson and Kate Pickett. The book argues that there are "pernicious effects that inequality has on societies: eroding trust, increasing anxiety and illness, (and) encouraging excessive consumption".

Originally titled The Spirit Level, The film ran a successful crowdfunding campaign through IndieGoGo, raising £70,000, £20,000 more than expected. The film was completed in 2015 and previewed that same year. It was released theatrically in the UK in April 2016. A US release is set to follow later in 2016. It was launched on Netflix on October 3, 2016 with streaming capabilities for US and UK territories only.

The film has appeared at several major film festivals including: Sheffield Doc/Fest (June 2015), Open City Film Festival in London(June 2015) where it was nominated for Best UK Film, Cork Film Festival (November 2015), and ZagrebDox Film Festival (February 2016).

Synopsis
As many Western countries have become richer, they've seemingly become unhappier; with fearful communities, health problems and violent deaths becoming more common not less. The Divide weaves together seven stories to paint a picture of how economic division creates social division. The film depicts the startling truth of struggling to make ends meet in America. Together, it ties the mentality that developed countries have become based around consumerism, materialism and the idea of happiness that these objects and actions should be in your life, despite that they seem to be perpetuating the individuals struggle. The Divide also showed that inequality can come from the people; how they view your "image", status, and neighborhood in which it can displayed either wealth or poverty.

Cast

Alden Cass — an American Wall Street Psychologist
Jennifer Cooper — an American Gated community resident
Darren McGarvey — Scottish rapper Loki, a former alcoholic
Rochelle Monte — an English Careworker
Janet Sparks — an American Walmart associate
Leah Taylor — an American KFC attendant
Keith Thomas — an American Three-strikes prisoner

Kwame Anthony Appiah — commentator
Rich Benjamin — commentator
Richard Berman — commentator
Alan Budd — commentator
Ha-Joon Chang — commentator
Noam Chomsky — commentator
Richard Frank — commentator
Alexis Goldstein — commentator
Max Hastings — commentator
Michael Marmot — commentator
Cathy O'Neil — commentator
Kate Pickett — commentator
Paul Piff — commentator
Richard G. Wilkinson — commentator

References

External links

 
 
 

2015 films
2015 documentary films
British documentary films
British independent films
British survival films
2015 independent films
Films scored by Andrew Hewitt
2010s English-language films
2010s British films